Shaun Stevenson (born 14 November 1996) is a New Zealand rugby union player who currently plays as an outside back for  in New Zealand's domestic Mitre 10 Cup and the  in the international Super Rugby competition.

Early career

Born in North Shore, in the Auckland suburbs, Stevenson attended Auckland Grammar School where he played first XV rugby for 3 years.

Senior career

Stevenson started out his provincial career with Hamilton-based side Waikato in 2015.   He debuted in a match against  on 14 August 2015 and went on to start in all 10 games during the season, scoring 4 tries in the process.   He won the Waikato Supporters Club player of the year award as a reward for his fine debut season.   2016 was not such a happy year for him as a MCL knee injury 38 minutes into the opening match of the season ruled him out for the rest of the year.

In October 2016 it was announced that Stevenson would join newly promoted Mitre 10 Cup Premiership side  for 2017, a move that would take him back to his place of birth.

Super Rugby

His debut season at provincial level brought him to the attention of local Super Rugby franchise, the Chiefs, who named him in their wider training group ahead of the 2016 Super Rugby season. In total he played 6 times and scored 2 tries in 2016. This was enough to see him promoted to the Chiefs main squad for 2017.

International

Stevenson was a New Zealand Schools representative in 2014 and was also a member of the New Zealand Under 20 side which finished 5th in the 2016 World Rugby Under 20 Championship where he scored 5 tries in 4 appearances.

Super Rugby Statistics

References

1996 births
Living people
New Zealand rugby union players
Rugby union fullbacks
Rugby union wings
Waikato rugby union players
People educated at Auckland Grammar School
Chiefs (rugby union) players
North Harbour rugby union players
Māori All Blacks players
Rugby union players from Auckland